Synergy Sports Technology is an American company that creates web-based, on-demand video-supported basketball analytics for scouting, development, and entertainment. Synergy partners with the NBA, WNBA, NCAA Division I Men’s and Women’s programs, FIBA, and international professional basketball leagues. It also serves various sports media and marketing companies, including ESPN, ABC Sports, Turner Sports, and EA Sports.

Synergy analysts use a proprietary logging system to tag and catalog every possession of every game. Collected data is synthesized and classified according to various indicators, including traditional and advanced statistics, play types, player behaviors, and game situations. Subscribed users can access, disaggregate and cross-reference this information through reports, custom query tools, charts, and graphs with data points linked to the entire archived series of corresponding video clips. Synergy’s cloud-based editing tool allows users to create and share unique video edits that others can view on a computer or via Synergy’s mobile app.  Video is typically available within 12 to 24 hours after the completion of a game; however, NBA games are usually published 45 minutes after games are played. NBA archives date to the 2004 season.

Coaches and players have praised Synergy’s product for allowing them to efficiently, comprehensively, and collaboratively evaluate the player and team performance and tendencies, significantly reducing and enhancing research time.

History
Founder and CEO Garrick Barr began developing the technologies that evolved into Synergy Sports Technology in 1992 when he transitioned from college basketball coach to assistant coach and video coordinator for the NBA’s Phoenix Suns. Barr first worked with engineers to develop a digital post-production editing system to expedite the onerous task of collecting, cataloging, and editing hundreds of hours of game film used for training. While the resulting technology achieved its goal, it still required teams to compile, edit and tag the footage.

Barr then sought to create technology to instantly produce advanced analytics that would use the company’s existing work in video logging and tagging. Along with friend Scott Mossman, Barr founded Quantified Scouting Service (QSS) in 1998. QSS produced computer-generated reports – accessible by teams through dial-up technology – revealed every player’s offensive tendencies.

In 2004, Barr renamed the company Synergy Sports Technology and brought in computer scientist Nils Lahr. Barr and Lahr developed the breakthrough application software and streaming media technology that allowed loggers to undertake the rapid video-data syncing and upload that laid the foundation for Synergy’s success.

In 2008, Synergy reached multi-year licensing agreement with the National Basketball Association to give NBA.com, NBA.tv, and the NBA’s television partners access to Synergy products and services. The same year, the company also announced a partnership with EA Sports to incorporate Synergy’s data into its NBA Live franchise.

References

External links

Software companies of the United States